In mathematics, a subset C of a real or complex vector space is said to be absolutely convex or disked if it is convex and balanced (some people use the term "circled" instead of "balanced"), in which case it is called a disk. 
The disked hull or the absolute convex hull of a set is the intersection of all disks containing that set.

Definition 

 is a convex and balanced set.
for any scalar  and  if  then 
for all scalars  and  if  then 
for any scalars  and  if  then 
for any scalars  if  then 

 In general,  is possible, even in finite dimensional vector spaces.
the intersection of all disks containing

Sufficient conditions 

The intersection of arbitrarily many absolutely convex sets is again absolutely convex; however, unions of absolutely convex sets need not be absolutely convex anymore.

If  is a disk in  then  is absorbing in  if and only if

Properties

If  is an absorbing disk in a vector space  then there exists an absorbing disk  in  such that  

The absolutely convex hull of a bounded set in a locally convex topological vector space is again bounded.

where the example below shows that this inclusion might be strict. 
However, for any subsets  if  then   which implies

Examples

For an example where  let  be the real vector space  and let  
Then  is a strict subset of  that is not even convex; 
in particular, this example also shows that the balanced hull of a convex set is  necessarily convex. 

Generalizations

A  is any non-negative function  that satisfies the following conditions:
 Subadditivity/Triangle inequality:  for all 
 Absolute homogeneity of degree :  for all  and all scalars 

This generalizes the definition of seminorms since a map is a seminorm if and only if it is a -seminorm (using ). 
There exist -seminorms that are not seminorms. For example, whenever  then the map  used to define the Lp space  is a -seminorm but not a seminorm.

See also

 
 
 
 
 
 
 
 , for vectors in physics

References

Bibliography

 
  
  
  

Abstract algebra
Convex analysis
Convex geometry
Group theory
Linear algebra